The Union of Baptist Churches in Serbia is a fellowship of Baptist churches, one of two Baptist groups in Serbia.

First known Baptist work in the area began in 1875 with Heinrich Meyer baptizing four Germans in Novi Sad. Work began among the Hungarians in 1899, Slovaks in 1900, Romanians in 1922, and Serbs in 1925. The German Baptists formed an association that continued to 1944. After Yugoslavia was formed in 1918, Baptists formed a union in 1924. The union ended during World War II, but was reorganized after the war. This union ceased to exist in 1991, and the Baptist Union of Serbia was founded March 21, 1992, then changed its name to Baptist Union of Yugoslavia, but has since been returned to the current name.

The Union is a member of the European Baptist Federation and the Baptist World Alliance. In 1998, the Union was made up of 51 congregations composed on 1619 members.

See also
 Union of Evangelical Christians-Baptists in Serbia and Montenegro
 Baptist Union of Romania
 Evangelical Baptist Union of Ukraine

References
Baptists Around the World, Albert W. Wardin, Jr., editor

External links
Adherents.com

Protestantism in Serbia
Christian organizations established in 1992
Baptist denominations in Europe
Baptist denominations established in the 20th century